Brendan Dunne (born 5 July 1955) is an Irish Olympic boxer. He became the first light-flyweight boxer to represent Ireland at the Olympic Games when he competed at the 1976 Summer Olympics in Montreal. He won his first match against Noboru Uchiyama of Japan, and lost his second against the eventual bronze medalist, Orlando Maldonado of Puerto Rico.

References

1955 births
Living people
Sportspeople from Dublin (city)
Irish male boxers
Olympic boxers of Ireland
Boxers at the 1976 Summer Olympics
Light-flyweight boxers